Pakistan's native fauna reflect its varied climatic zones. The northern Pakistan, which includes Khyber Pakhtunkhwa and Gilgit Baltistan, has portions of two biodiversity hotspots, Mountains of Central Asia and Himalayas.

Distribution

Northern highlands and plains

The northern highlands include lower elevation areas of Potohar and Pakistan Administered Kashmir regions and higher elevation areas embracing the foothills of Himalayan, Karakorum and Hindukush mountain ranges. Some of the wildlife species found on northern mountainous areas and Pothohar Plateau include the non-threatened mammal species of bharal, Eurasian lynx, Himalayan goral, Indian leopard, Marco Polo sheep, marmot (in Deosai National Park) and yellow-throated marten and birds species of chukar partridge, Eurasian eagle-owl, Himalayan monal and Himalayan snowcock and amphibian species of Himalayan toad and Muree Hills frog. The threatened ones include Asiatic black bear, Himalayan brown bear, Indian wolf, Kashmir gray langur, Kashmir red deer, markhor, rhesus macaque, Siberian ibex, smooth-coated otter and white-bellied musk deer, bird species of cheer pheasant, peregrine falcon, western tragopan and reptile species of mugger crocodile.

Indus plains and deserts of Sindh
River Indus and its numerous eastern tributaries of Chenab form many fluvial landforms that occupy most of Indus plains in Punjab and western Sindh. Some of the non-threatened mammal species of the Indus plains and the deserts of Sindh include the nilgai, red fox and wild boar, bird species of Alexandrine parakeet, barn owl, black kite, myna, hoopoe, Indian peafowl, red-vented bulbul, rock pigeon, shelduck and shikra, reptile species of Indian cobra, Indian star tortoise, Sindh krait and yellow monitor and amphibian species of Indus Valley bullfrog and Indus Valley toad. Some of the threatened mammal species include the axis deer, blackbuck, hog deer, Indian rhinoceros, Punjab urial and Sindh ibex, bird species of white-backed vulture and reptile species of black pond turtle and gharial. Grey partridge is one of the few birds that can be found in the Cholistan desert. The Tharparkar desert supports a fair population of the chinkara. The Asiatic wild ass migrates from the Indian part of the Great Rann of Kutch to the part in Pakistan in search of food.

Extinct
The Asiatic lion used to occur in this region. In 1810, a lion was killed near Kot Diji.

Western highlands, plains and deserts
Western region of Pakistan, most of which is enveloped in Balochistan province, has a complex geography. Some of the mammal species include the caracal, Balochistan leopard, Balochistan forest dormouse, Blanford's fox, dromedary camel, goitered gazelle, Indian crested porcupine, long-eared hedgehog, markhor, ratel and striped hyena, bird species of bearded vulture, houbara bustard and merlin, reptile species of leopard gecko and saw-scaled viper and amphibian species of Balochistan toad.

Wetlands, coastal regions and marine life
There are a number of protected wetlands (under Ramsar Convention) across Pakistan. The wetlands are a habitat for migratory birds such as Dalmatian pelicans and demoiselle crane as well as predatory species of osprey, common kingfisher, fishing cat and leopard cat near the coastline. Chashma and Taunsa Barrage Dolphin Sanctuary protects the threatened species of Indus river dolphins which live in freshwater. The coastline of Pakistan is 1,050 km long and consists of a variety of habitat types, supporting a wide range of animals, of which over 1000 are fish species in the reefs of its continental shelf. West coast of Great Rann of Kutch, east to the Indus River Delta and below Tharparkar desert, is one of the few places where greater flamingos come to breed. It is also a habitat for endangered species of lesser florican. The Indus River Delta provide nesting grounds for common snakehead, giant snakehead, Indus baril and many species of catfish like rita. The hilsa swims up from the Arabian Sea to spawn in freshwater. Species that are important to people as food, such as the golden mahseer and large freshwater shrimp (Macrobrachium species), are part of the abundant aquatic life. Along the shores of Astola and Ormara beaches of Balochistan and Hawk'e Bay and Sandspit beaches of Sindh are nesting sites for five endangered species of sea turtles: green sea, loggerhead, hawksbill, olive ridley and leatherback. Sea snakes such as yellow-bellied sea snake are also found in the pelagic zone of the sea. The wetlands of Pakistan are also a home to the endangered species of gharial and mugger crocodile who prefer freshwater habitat.

Cultural significance

Taxonomic classification
Molluscs of Pakistan
Non-marine molluscs
Marine molluscs
Arthropods of Pakistan
Ants of Pakistan
Odonates of Pakistan
Moths of Pakistan
Butterflies of Pakistan
Spiders of Pakistan
Crustaceans of Pakistan
Chordates of Pakistan
Fishes of Pakistan
Amphibians of Pakistan
Reptiles of Pakistan
Birds of Pakistan
Mammals of Pakistan

See also
Ecoregions of Pakistan
Forestry in Pakistan
Wildlife of Pakistan
Flora of Pakistan

References

External links
Pakista largest Wildlife Website
Pakistan Avicultural Foundation

 
Biota of Pakistan
Fauna of South Asia

nn:Pakistansk natur
simple:Flora and fauna of Pakistan